In the United States, a state court has jurisdiction over disputes with some connection to a U.S. state. State courts handle the vast majority of civil and criminal cases in the United States; the United States federal courts are far smaller in terms of both personnel and caseload, and handle different types of cases.

Each state "is free to organize its courts as it sees fit," and consequently, "no two states have identical court structures." Generally, state courts are common law courts, and apply their respective state laws and procedures to decide cases.  They are organized pursuant to and apply the law in accordance with their state's constitution, state statutes, and binding decisions of courts in their state court hierarchy.  Where applicable, they also apply federal law.  Generally, a single judicial officer, usually called a judge, exercises original jurisdiction by presiding over contested criminal or civil actions which culminate in trials, although most matters stop short of reaching trial.  The decisions of lower courts may be reviewed by a panel of a state court of appeals.  Generally, there is also a highest court for appeals, a state supreme court, that oversees the court system.  In matters that involve issues of federal law, the final decision of the state's highest court (including refusals to hear final appeals) may be appealed to the United States Supreme Court (which also has the discretion to refuse to hear them).

Types of state courts
Cases in state courts begin in a trial court where lawsuits and criminal cases are filed and evidence is eventually presented if a case proceeds to a hearing or trial. Trials in these courts are often held only after extensive pre-trial procedures that in more than 90% of cases lead to a default judgment in a civil case, an agreed resolution settling the case or plea bargain resolving a criminal case, or pre-trial resolution of the case by a judge either on the merits or on procedural grounds.  Territory outside of any state in the United States, such as the District of Columbia or American Samoa, often has a court system established under federal or territorial law which substitutes for a state court system and is distinct from the ordinary federal court system.

State trial courts are usually located in a courthouse, which is often in the county seat. Even when state trial courts include more than one county in a judicial district, it is not uncommon for the state trial court to hold regular sessions at each county seat in its jurisdiction and function from the point of view of litigants as if it were a county-based court.

If one of the litigants is unsatisfied with the decision of the lower court, the matter may be taken up on appeal (but an acquittal in a criminal trial may not be appealed by the state due to the Fifth Amendment protection against double jeopardy). Usually, an intermediate appellate court, if there is one in that state, often called the state court of appeals, will review the decision of the trial court.  If still unsatisfied, the litigant can appeal to the highest appellate court in the state, which is usually called the state supreme court and is usually located in or near the state capital. Appellate courts in the United States, unlike their civil law counterparts, are generally not permitted to correct mistakes concerning the facts of the case on appeal, only mistakes of law, or findings of fact with no support in the trial court record.

Many states have courts of limited jurisdiction (inferior jurisdiction), presided over by, for example, a magistrate or justice of the peace who hears criminal arraignments and tries petty offenses and small civil cases.  Appeals from courts of limited jurisdiction are frequently sent to state trial courts of general jurisdiction rather than to an appellate court.

Larger cities often have city courts (also known as municipal courts) which hear traffic offenses and violations of city ordinances; in some states, such as New York, these courts also have broader jurisdictions as inferior jurisdiction courts and can handle small civil claims and misdemeanors. Other courts of limited jurisdiction include alderman's courts, police court, mayor's courts, recorder's courts, county courts, probate courts, municipal courts, juvenile courts, courts of claims, courts of common pleas, family courts, small claims courts, tax courts, water courts (present in some western states such as Colorado and Montana), and workers' compensation courts.  Many states follow the federal government practice of having one or more separate systems of administrative law judges in the executive branch in addition to judicial branch judges, for example, to handle driver's license revocations, unemployment insurance claims, or land use disputes.

All these courts are distinguished from courts of general jurisdiction (also known as "superior jurisdiction"), which are the default type of trial court that can hear any case which is not required to be first heard in a court of limited jurisdiction. Most such cases are civil cases involving large sums of money or criminal trials arising from serious crimes like rape and murder. Typically, felonies are handled in general jurisdiction courts, while misdemeanors and other lesser offenses are handled in inferior jurisdiction courts. Unlike most European courts (in both common law and civil law countries), American state courts do not usually have a separate court that handles serious crimes; jurisdiction lies with the court that handles all other felony cases in a given county. But, many state courts that handle criminal cases have separate divisions or judges assigned to handle certain types of crimes such as a drug court, sometimes also known as a "problem-solving court".

A few states like California have unified all courts of general and inferior jurisdiction to make the judicial process more efficient. In such judicial systems, there are still departments of limited jurisdiction within the trial courts, and often these departments occupy exactly the same facilities they once occupied as independent courts of limited jurisdiction. However, as mere administrative divisions, departments can be rearranged at the discretion of each trial court's presiding judge in response to changing caseloads.

State court judges

Unlike federal courts, where judges are presidential appointees confirmed by the U.S. Senate serving life terms of office, the vast majority of states have some judges who are elected, and the methods of appointment for appointed judges vary widely. State court judges are usually distinguished attorneys who have had some political involvement, who are pursuing second careers on the bench. But a small number of state court judges, particularly in limited jurisdiction trial courts in rural areas or small towns, are non-lawyers, who are often elected to their posts.

A disproportionate share of state court judges previously served as prosecutors, or less commonly as criminal defense attorneys or trial lawyers, although no particular background as an attorney is required to serve as a judge. The judiciary is not a separate profession in the American legal system as it is in many civil law jurisdictions.  While in many civil law jurisdictions a common judicial career involves an entry level assignment in an inferior court followed by promotions to more senior courts over the course of a career, no U.S. court system makes experience in an inferior judicial position a pre-requisite to higher judicial office.

While many countries consider criminal prosecutors to be part of the judicial branch, in the United States, all criminal prosecutors are considered part of the executive branch.  The fact that all attorneys admitted to the practice of law are somewhat confusingly called "officers of the court" in U.S. legal practice is a legal fiction that calls attention to the special professional ethical obligations that all lawyers have to the court, and does not mean that all lawyers are employees or agents of the judicial branch.

State court judges are typically paid less, have smaller staffs, and handle larger caseloads than their counterparts in the federal judiciary.

Differences among the states
Delaware, Mississippi, New Jersey, Tennessee and Wyoming make a distinction between a "court of law" and a "court of equity" (chancery court). For the most part in the American legal system, while the distinction between law and equity still has some legal consequences, separate court systems are not maintained at the federal level or in other states.
Texas and Oklahoma have separate courts of last resort for criminal cases and other cases. In all other states, there is a single court of last resort.  While collateral attacks on criminal convictions, such as state level habeas corpus petitions, are usually considered to be technically civil cases, because they are not brought by a prosecutor and do not seek to convict someone of a crime, these suits are, in both states, appealed to the criminal court of last resort, rather than the civil court of last resort.
The highest appellate court in New York and the only appellate court in the District of Columbia, is called Court of Appeals rather than "Supreme Court."  In New York, the Supreme Court is the court of general jurisdiction, and has both county trial divisions and four regional Appellate Divisions that serve as the intermediate appellate courts in the New York judiciary.
The courts of Louisiana and the Commonwealth of Puerto Rico are organized under a civil law model with significantly different procedures from those of the courts in all other states and the District of Columbia, which are based upon the traditions of the common law of England.  The court process used in these jurisdictions differs considerably from that used in the federal courts and the courts of other states in non-criminal cases. However, the U.S. Constitution requires these jurisdictions to use procedures similar to those of other U.S. jurisdictions in criminal cases.
The courts of one state are generally not required to follow the decisions of the courts of another state, but in the common law legal system it is customary for the courts of one state to look to decisions of other states as persuasive statements of what the law should be in the state making the decision, where express statutory provisions or prior precedent in that state do not control.
A small number of states lack an intermediate appellate court. In those states, litigants in general jurisdiction courts usually have the right to appeal their cases directly to the state supreme court.  However, the U.S. Supreme Court has repeatedly ruled that appeal is not a federal constitutional right, meaning that states are not obligated to provide it. In three states, New Hampshire, Virginia, and West Virginia, one can only petition the state supreme court for a first appeal, and the state supreme court can reject the petition and never decide the appeal on the merits. While Virginia has an intermediate appellate court, that court has narrowly defined jurisdiction, and even within that jurisdiction, not all appeals are by right. Many states have rules that permit certain cases such as death penalty cases and election cases to be appealed directly to the state supreme court, even though most civil cases must be appealed first to an intermediate appellate court.
 One major difference is whether states conceptualize of their trial court of general jurisdiction as a single unified court of statewide jurisdiction that merely happens to sit in particular counties or districts, or as a set of separate and coequal courts, one for each county or district. The most extreme exponent of the first position is New York, which has a single Supreme Court that sits as a trial court with general jurisdiction throughout the entire state. The most extreme exponent of the second position is Texas, where each trial court is constituted as a legally distinct entity with a single judge. The language in the Texas Constitution requiring one judge per court was not fixed until 1985. Thus, an urban courthouse in Texas normally houses multiple single-judge trial courts sharing concurrent jurisdiction over the same county.
In Utah, civil cases are appealed directly to the state supreme court, which then has the power to refer the case instead to an intermediate appellate court, rather than being appealed first to an intermediate appellate court and then to a state supreme court. Oklahoma has a similar structure: civil cases are appealed directly to the Supreme Court, which can refer them down to the Courts of Civil Appeals. (Criminal cases are appealed to the Court of Criminal Appeals and there is no intermediate court for such cases).

Nature of matters handled in state courts

Civil cases

The vast majority of non-criminal cases in the United States are handled in state courts, rather than federal courts.  For example, in Colorado, roughly 97% of all civil cases were filed in state courts and 89% of the civil cases filed in federal court were bankruptcies in 2002, a typical year. Just 0.3% of the non-bankruptcy civil cases in the state were filed in federal court.

A large share of all civil cases filed in state courts are debt collection cases. For example, in Colorado in 2002, about 87% of all civil cases filed in the courts of inferior jurisdiction were debt collection and eviction cases, while in the court of general jurisdiction, about 60% of all civil cases (other than domestic relations and probate cases) were debt collection, foreclosure, and tax collection cases. A large share of the balance of civil cases in courts of limited jurisdiction involve temporary restraining orders, typically in non-marital domestic relations contexts, and name change petitions (generally for child custody reasons or related to taking an American alternative to a non-U.S. name, marriage and divorce related name changes are normally handled elsewhere).  A large share of the balance of civil cases in courts of general jurisdiction involve divorces, child custody disputes, child abuse cases, uncontested probate administrations, and personal injury cases that do not involve workplace injuries (which are usually handled through a non-judicial workers' compensation process).

Many state court civil cases produce quick default judgments or pretrial settlements, but even considering only cases that actually go to trial, state courts are the dominant forum for civil cases. In Colorado, in 2002, there were 79 civil trials in federal court (41 jury and 38 non-jury), and 5950 civil trials in state court (300 jury and 5650 non-jury).  Essentially all probate and divorce cases are also brought in state court, even if the parties involved live in different states.  In practice, almost all real property evictions and foreclosures are handled in state court.

State courts systems always contain some courts of "general jurisdiction". All disputes which are capable of being brought in courts, arising under either state or federal law may be brought in one of the state courts, except in a few narrow case where federal law specifically limits jurisdiction exclusively to the federal courts.  Some of the most notable cases exclusively in federal jurisdiction are suits between state governments, suits involving ambassadors, certain intellectual property cases, federal criminal cases, bankruptcy cases, large interstate class action cases, and most securities fraud class actions.  There are also a handful of federal laws under which lawsuits can be pursued only in state court, such as those arising under the federal "junk fax" law.  There have been times in U.S. history where almost all small claims, even if they arose under federal law, were required to be brought in state courts.

State court systems usually have expedited procedures for civil disputes involving small dollar amounts (typically under $5,000 to $25,000 depending upon the state court in question), most of which involve collection of small contractual debts (such as unpaid credit cards) and landlord-tenant matters.  Many states have small claims divisions where all parties proceed in civil cases without lawyers, often before a magistrate or justice of the peace. Federal courts do not have parallel small claims procedures and apply the same civil rules to all civil cases, which makes federal court an expensive venue for a private party to pursue a claim for a small dollar amount.

Unlike state courts, federal courts are courts of "limited jurisdiction", that can only hear the types of cases specified in the Constitution and federal statutes (primarily federal crimes, cases arising under federal law, cases with a United States government party, and cases involving a diversity of citizenship between the parties).

Often, a plaintiff can bring a matter either to state court or to federal court, because it arises under federal law, or involves a substantial monetary dispute (in excess of $75,000 as of October 26, 2007) arising under state law between parties that do not reside in the same state.  If a plaintiff files suit in state court in such a case, the defendant can remove the case to federal court.

There is no federal constitutional right to a trial by jury in a state civil case under the Seventh Amendment to the United States Constitution, and not all states preserve a right to a civil jury in either their state constitution or state statutes. In practice, however, civil jury trials are available, generally on a similar basis to their availability in federal court, in every state except Louisiana. In these states, there is a general right to a jury trial in cases that would arise at law in colonial England, which generally includes most cases seeking simple money damages and no other relief.  In practice, about three-quarters of all civil jury trials involved personal injury cases, and most of the rest involve breaches of contracts. In states where a state constitution provides for a right to a jury trial, or a right to open courts, this has sometimes been interpreted to confer not only a procedural right to a certain type of trial, but also a substantive right to have redress through the courts for the kinds of injuries that were compensable at common law.

Prior to trial, most proceedings in non-criminal courts are conducted via papers filed in the court, often through lawyers. In limited jurisdiction courts, it is not uncommon for an initial appearance to be made in person at which a settlement is often reached. In general jurisdiction state courts, it is not uncommon for all pre-trial matters to be conducted outside the court, with attorneys negotiating scheduling matters, pre-trial examinations of witnesses taking place in lawyer's office through depositions, and a settlement conference conducted by a private mediator at the mediator's office.

Criminal cases

As of 2019, about 1,255,689 people currently behind bars in the United States—or 87.7% out of a total of 1,430,805 prisoners—had been convicted in state court for violating state criminal laws, rather than in federal court for violating federal criminal laws.

The proportion of criminal cases brought in state court rather than federal court is higher than 87.7% because misdemeanor and petty offense prosecutions are disproportionately brought in state courts and most criminal prosecutions involve misdemeanors and petty offenses.  The number of trials conducted in each system is another way to illustrate the relative size of the two criminal justice systems. In Colorado, in 2002, there were approximately 40 criminal trials in federal court, and there were 1,898 criminal trials (excluding hundreds of quasi-criminal trials in juvenile cases, municipal cases and infraction cases) in state courts, so only about 2% of criminal trials took place in federal court.  Most jury trials in the United States (roughly five out of six jury trials conducted in any U.S. Court) take place in criminal cases in state courts.

State courts do not have jurisdiction over criminal cases arising on Indian reservations even if those reservations are located in their state. Less serious crimes on Indian reservations are prosecuted in tribal courts. A large share of violent crimes that are prosecuted in federal court arise on Indian reservations or federal property, where state courts lack jurisdiction, since tribal court jurisdiction is usually limited to less serious offenses.  Federal crimes on federal property in a state are often defined with reference to state criminal law.

Federal courts disproportionately handle white-collar crimes, immigration-related crimes and drug offenses (these crimes make up about 70% of the federal docket, but just 19% of the state court criminal docket).  Federal courts have the power to bring death penalty charges under federal law, even if they arise in states where there is no death penalty under state law, but the federal government rarely utilizes this right.

Many rights of criminal defendants in state courts arise under federal law, but federal courts only examine if the state courts applied those federal rights correctly on a direct appeal from the conviction to the U.S. Supreme Court, after state court direct appeals have been exhausted, or in a collateral attack on a conviction in a habeas corpus proceeding after all state court remedies (usually including a state court habeas corpus proceeding) have been exhausted.  Some rights of criminal defendants that apply in federal court do not exist in state court. For example, in many states there is no constitutional right to be indicted by a grand jury before facing a criminal prosecution for a felony or infamous misdemeanor. Oregon does not require unanimous juries in non-capital criminal cases.

Unlike non-criminal cases, criminal proceedings in state courts are primarily conducted orally, in person, in open court.

Administration

In most, but not all states (California and New York are significant exceptions), the state supreme court or a related administrative body has the power to write the rules of procedure that govern the courts through a rule-making process. In a minority of the states, criminal and civil procedure are largely governed by state statutes.

Most states model their general jurisdiction trial court rules closely upon the Federal Rules of Civil Procedure with modifications to address types of cases that come up only in state practice (like traffic violations), and model their professional ethics rules closely upon models drafted by the American Bar Association with minor modifications. A minority of states, however, have idiosyncratic procedural rules, often based on the Field Code in place in many states before the Federal Rules of Civil Procedure were adopted.  Importantly, neither California nor New York state follow federal models.

Typically, state trial courts of limited jurisdiction have generally similar rules to state trial courts of general jurisdiction, but are stripped of rules applicable to special cases like class actions and many pretrial procedures (such as out-of-court discovery in the absence of a court order).

Most state supreme courts also have general supervisory authority over the state court system. In this capacity they are responsible, for example, for making budget requests and administrative management decisions for the court system as a whole. In most states, such administrative authority has been transferred or delegated to a state judicial council which includes members of lower courts.

State court regulation of lawyers

All state supreme courts are the de jure primary regulatory body for all lawyers in their state and determine who can practice law and when lawyers are sanctioned for violations of professional ethical rules, which are generally also put in place as state court rules.  In all states, such powers have been delegated either to the state bar association or various committees, commissions, or offices directly responsible to the state supreme court. The result is that such subordinate entities generally have original jurisdiction over lawyer admissions and discipline, nearly all de facto lawyer regulation takes place through such entities, and the state supreme court becomes directly involved only when petitioned to not ratify the decisions made by some subordinate entity in its name.

Relationship to federal courts

Although the United States Constitution and federal laws override state laws where there is a conflict between federal and state law, state courts are not subordinate to federal courts. Rather, as instruments of separate sovereigns (under the U.S. system of dual sovereignty), they are two parallel sets of courts with different but often overlapping jurisdiction.

As the U.S. Supreme Court recognized in Erie Railroad Co. v. Tompkins (1938), no part of the federal Constitution actually grants federal courts the power to directly decide the content of state law.   Clause 1 of Section 2 of Article Three of the United States Constitution describes the scope of federal judicial power, but only extended it to "the Laws of the United States" and not the laws of the several or individual states.

The U.S. Supreme Court can but is not required to review final decisions of state courts, after a party exhausts all remedies up to a request for relief from the state's highest appellate court, if the Court believes that the case involves an important question of federal law.  Because of the aforementioned silence in the Constitution (as well as Section 25 of the Judiciary Act of 1789 and successor sections), the Court cannot and never reviews decisions of state courts that depend entirely on the resolution of a state law issue; there must be an issue of federal law (such as the federal constitutional right to due process) implicit in the state case before the Court will even agree to hear it.  Since there really is no such issue in the vast majority of state cases, the decision of the state supreme court in such cases is effectively final, as any petition for certiorari to the U.S. Supreme Court will be summarily denied without comment.

Nomenclature
The following table notes the names of the courts in the states and territories of the United States. Listed are the principal trial courts of general jurisdiction, the principal intermediate appellate courts, and the state supreme courts.

Courts are described below in the singular when state law defines only one statewide court of that name (whose judges may be assigned to particular counties, circuits, or districts, but still remain part of a single court).  Courts are described below in the plural when they are defined by state law as a set of separate courts, each exercising jurisdiction only over a specifically defined territory within the state.

In some states, the number of county-based courts does not exactly match the number of actual counties in the state. This occurs when a single court has jurisdiction over more than one county.

See also
Courts of the United States

References

External links and references
2004 United States Justice Department Report
National Center for State Courts, including State Court Structure Charts
Gavel2Gavel's State Court web directory, an ad-supported website
Federal Court Statistics 2002
Census of State Court Organization Bureau of Justice Statistics
Colorado Court Statistics 2002
Statistical Abstract of the United States